Hoseynabad (also Romanized as Ḩoseynābād and Hoseyn Ābād; also known as Ḩoseynābād-e Shokrā’ī, Ḩoseynābād Shokrā’ī, and Husainābād) is a village in Milajerd Rural District, Milajerd District, Komijan County, Markazi Province, Iran. At the 2006 census, its population was 573, in 143 families.

References 

Populated places in Komijan County